The Nachole Uprising was a peasant uprising in Nachole Upazila in then East Bengal (present Bangladesh), Pakistan. It was similar to the Tebhaga movement occurring in West Bengal, Indian around the same time.

History
Jotedar, land holders, in Nachole Upazlia used to collect rent from peasants in the form of a percentage of their harvest (50 percent).  The peasants, most of whom were members of the minority Santal community, revolted against the high rent in December 1949 and early 1950s. They had farmed the same land for generations without any land rights or protections. The revolt was encouraged by communist activists. The homes of Jotedars were looted. The government responded with violence in favor of the landlords. The government arrest activists like Ila Mitra, who fled to India after being released on political consideration by the government. Many of the Santal peasants who participated in the revolt fled to India. The government had deployed two thousand army and police personals. Hundreds of villages of the Santal People were destroyed by security forces.

Legacy
The Government of Pakistan passed the East Bengal State Acquisition and Tenancy Act of 1950 which allow the tenets to pay rent in cash at a fixed government rate and provided them with greater rights to the property. Many of the Santals abandoned the region permanently for India as a result of the immediate government crackdown. The event is remembered and celebrated in the region on the birth anniversary of Ila Mitra. There was a period of communal violence against Hindu minority in the region with the tacit support of Pakistan security services.

References

History of East Pakistan
Social movements in Pakistan
1949 in East Pakistan
1950 in East Pakistan
Conflicts in 1949
Conflicts in 1950